This is a list of all military weapons ever used by the United States. This list will include all lists dealing with US weapons to show all weapons ever used by the United States of America.

American Revolution 

 List of infantry weapons in the American Revolution

American Civil War 

 List of weapons in the American Civil War

Spanish-American War 

 List of weapons of the Spanish–American War

World War II 

 List of equipment of the United States Army during World War II

Cold war

Korean War 

 List of Korean War weapons

Vietnam War 

 Weapons of the Vietnam War

Modern day 

 List of equipment of the United States Army
 List of weapons of the United States Marine Corps

See also 

 List of wars involving the United States

References

Weapons
Military
United States Weapons